David Jessel Turner-Samuels  (5 April 1918 –19 November 2016) was a British barrister. He was the son of British Politician Moss Turner-Samuels who was the Labour MP for Gloucester during Clement Attlee's time in office.

Turner-Samuels was educated at Westminster School, and was called to the Bar at Middle Temple. He practiced in the Cloisters chambers with John Platts-Mills, Stephen Sedley and Michael Mansfield.

He died on 19 November 2016 at the age of 98.

References

1918 births
2016 deaths
English King's Counsel
English barristers
People educated at Westminster School, London
Members of the Middle Temple